Pablo David Sabbag Daccarett (born 11 June 1997) is a Colombian Syrian footballer who plays for La Equidad.

References

1997 births
Living people
Colombian footballers
Colombian expatriate footballers
Colombian people of Syrian descent
Association football forwards
Footballers from Barranquilla
Categoría Primera A players
Categoría Primera B players
Primeira Liga players
Deportivo Cali footballers
Orsomarso S.C. footballers
C.D. Tondela players
La Equidad footballers
Newell's Old Boys footballers
Estudiantes de La Plata footballers
Expatriate footballers in Portugal
Expatriate footballers in Argentina
Colombian expatriate sportspeople in Portugal
Colombian expatriate sportspeople in Argentina